CJ Group is a South Korean international conglomerate holding company and one of the largest chaebol headquartered in Seoul, South Korea. It comprises numerous businesses in various industries of food and food service, pharmaceutics and biotechnology, entertainment and media, home shopping and logistics. CJ Group was originally a branch of Samsung.

CJ comes from 'Cheil Jedang' (Hangul: 제일 제당), which can literally mean "first sugar manufacture", the industry where it originally started.

Notable CJ subsidiaries include CJ CheilJedang (Food and Beverage), CJ Logistics (Logistics), CJ Olive Networks (Health & Beauty Stores & IT), CJ ENM (Entertainment and Retail), and CJ CGV (Cinema Chain). The group is chaired by Lee Jay-hyun, eldest grandson of Samsung's founder.

History

1955 to 1970
CJ was founded as 'Cheil Jedang' in August 1955 as a sugar and flour manufacturer and was originally part of Samsung Group, as its first manufacturing business. In 1955, it opened the first flour mill in South Korea and in 1962, started exporting sugar to Okinawa, Japan. In 1965, Cheil Jedang's sugar business was branded as 'Beksul'. The company entered into the artificial seasoning market in 1963 with Mipoong, competing against Miwon, the then-best-seller by Daesang.

1971 to 1990
In the 1970s, CJ continued its growth as a composite food company. In 1973 CJ entered into the feed business, launching 'Pungnyeon Feed'. In 1975, CJ developed mass-production techniques for "Dashida", a seasoning product, as well as technology for the mass-production of nucleic acids for the first time in South Korea in 1977, launching first market its first nucleic acid seasoning, "Imi". In 1979, the company was renamed 'Cheil Jedang Corp.' and started producing cooking oil under Beksul.

In the 1980s, CJ expanded to processed food items such as beverages and frozen foods, and entered the pharmaceutical business based on new advanced technologies. In 1984, CJ established ETI, a local subsidiary, in New Jersey, U.S. as a joint venture project In 1986 CJ's Biotechnology & Pharmaceutics division succeeded in becoming the third in the world to develop Alpha-interferon, an anticancer medicine, as well as launching 'Hepaccine-B', a hepatitis vaccine. It established Cheil Frozen Food and launched its beverage business in 1987. With the establishment of Cheil Jedang Indonesia in 1988 and the construction of a lysine and synthetic seasoning plant in Indonesia in 1990, CJ started reaching markets outside South Korea.

1991 to 2001
In the 1990s, CJ went through periods of conversion and growth as it transitioned into the area of life and culture from focusing on the food and pharmaceutical industry. However, it continued to develop new food products such as 'Condition', a supplemental drink that alleviates hangover symptoms, in 1992 and 'Hetbahn', an aseptic packaged rice, in 1996.
In July 1993, Cheil Jedang spun off from Samsung and gained independent management, changing into a life and culture group by entering into the food service and entertainment industries. In 1996 it became 'Cheil Jedang Group' and completed its official separation from Samsung Group in February 1997.

Since then, CJ has entered into the fields of media, entertainment, finance and information & communication businesses mainly through M&As of companies such as m.net, a music cable channel, and Cheil Investment & Securities in 1997, and establishments of new subsidiaries such as Cheil Golden Village (currently CGV) in 1996, Dreamline (which was sold off in 2000), jointly with Korea Expressway in 1997, [CJ GLS] in 1998, CJ O Shopping, CJ Europe and CJ FD (standing for food distribution) in 1999. In addition, CJ opened VIPS, a family restaurant chain, in 1997, and launched South Korea's first multiplex theater, CGV, in 1998.

2003 to present
In October 2002, CJ Group was launched and the official name of the company changed to 'CJ Co., Ltd'. In September 2007, CJ Co., Ltd again spun off as a business holding company renaming to 'CJ CheilJedang Co., Ltd' and CJ Group became a holding company for a number of food and entertainment-related subsidiaries based in South Korea. It consists of four main core businesses: Food & Food Service, Bio Pharmaceutics, Entertainment Media, and Home Shopping & Logistics.

Korean billionaire Lee Jay-Hyun has been chairman of CJ Group since March 2002. His older sister Lee Mi-kyoung is the vice chairman of the company.

Starting from May 2007, CJ Group announced that it will be hiring more women in the company. It also announced that it will be doubling their allowance time for women who need to go on leave due to pregnancy. (Maternity Leave). Korean law requires women be allowed up to 90 days of maternity leave. However, CJ has extended this time to one year.

In 2010, CJ Media, CJ Entertainment, Mnet media, On-Media and CJ Internet merged to form O Media Holdings, which became CJ E&M in March 2011. Since then, CJ E&M has been highly influential in its contribution to Korean pop culture and the "Korean Wave", a phenomenon of the spread of Korean culture, through the creation of successful TV programs such as "Superstar K,", "Respond 1997", and films such as "Masquerade".

Since introducing the first multiplex theaters, CGV, in 1998 to South Korea, the company has been developing what it calls "cultureplex", a space where eateries, performance halls, shops and multiplex theaters come together to provide a more rich cultural experience to consumers, CGV Cheongdam Cine City, which opened in 2011 being an example.

In July 2018, CJ E&M and CJ O Shopping merged into new company CJ ENM (CJ Entertainment and Merchandising).

In August 2018, CJ CheilJedang acquired Kahiki Foods, an American food manufacturing company based in Columbus, Ohio.

Global expansion
CEO Lee Jay-Hyun has announced 2013 to be the start of CJ's full-fledged global expansion efforts, setting 2020 as their goal of achieving its vision of "Great CJ". By 2020, the conglomerate hopes to reach 100 trillion won in sales, 70 percent of which they expect will come from abroad, and to grow into the world's No.1 at least two of its core businesses. As of 2013, CJ has penetrated into the global market throughout Japan, China, Europe, the U.S. and South America (especially Brazil).

Food and beverage service
Taking Korean food abroad, CJ Foodville has launched bakeries and restaurants globally.
Starting with opening a Tous les Jours store, a bakery chain, in Los Angeles in 2004, CJ has launched the chain also in China and Vietnam, where double-digit sales growth is maintained. The first Tous Les Jours in Hanoi, Vietnam, opened in June 2012, and in December 2012, the 20th and 21st Tous les Jours opened in New Jersey and New York.
Also brands of Foodville, VIPS (steakhouse) and A Twosome Place (coffee shope) have opened stores in China  and Vietnam as well as other countries in Asia.
Bibigo is a Bibimbap (a traditional Korean food) restaurant which CJ planned as a global brand from the beginning, opening in Los Angeles, Beijing and Singapore since 2010. It also opened its first store in London in 2012 during the London Olympics. In 2018, CJ CheilJedang acquired Kahiki Foods, an American food manufacturing company based in Columbus, Ohio.

Biotechnology and pharmaceutics
In 2012, the construction of the $400 million nucleic acid factory in Shenyang, China was completed and will start producing animal feeds such as lysine and threonine and nucleotides in 2013. CJ is also constructing a lysine plant in Fort Dodge, Iowa, which is scheduled to start production within 2013 and CJ expects this will help reach 30 percent of the global market share within the year, topping GBT of China, Ajinomoto of Japan, and ADM of the U.S.

Home shopping and logistics
CJ O Shopping, CJ's cable home shopping channel, entered into China in 2004, India in 2009, Japan and Vietnam in 2011, Thailand and Turkey in 2012, the Philippines (together with ABS-CBN) in 2013 and Mexico (together with Televisa) in 2015.
CJ GLS and CJ Korea Express are the logistics part of the company that handles its international affiliates. CJ has exported its logistics system to India in 2011, Vietnam in 2011, soon after the launch of CJ O Shopping, and Thailand in 2009, in which CJ GLS hopes to expand throughout the entire country by 2016.

Entertainment and media
CJ E&M leads the Korean Wave with its K-pop content business. "Mnet Asian Music Awards" was held in Macau in 2010, Singapore in 2011 and in Hong Kong in 2012 and 2013, attracting more than 1 billion viewers worldwide.
CJ CGV, CJ's movie business, is expected to open 15 IMAX theaters in China by the end of 2015. through new joint projects across China.

Family feud
Although spun off from Samsung in 1993, CJ is still related to Samsung through family ties. The CEO of Samsung, Lee Kun-hee, is the younger brother of Lee Maeng-hee, the former president of CJ. The family came to the center of the media spotlight when Lee Maeng-hee and sister Lee Sook-hee filed civil suits against Lee Kun-hee, claiming that Lee Kun-hee had illegally acquired his inheritance by concealing parts of their father's, Lee Byeong-chul, assets. As a remedy, they asked for shares of Samsung Life Insurance, which controls Samsung Electronics.

Since then, the feud was highly publicized as the brothers were quoted in attacking each other through the media, and intensified after it was found out that a Samsung employee had tailed Lee Jay-hyun, the chairman of CJ group.

In January 2013, the court ruled against Lee Maeng-hee on the basis that there was not enough evidence to prove that the dividends and proceeds of Samsung was part of the inheritance.

Conviction of chairman
Company chairman Lee Jay-hyun was arrested in 2013 and convicted in 2014 of tax evasion and embezzlement. He was released from prison in August 2016 in an annual presidential pardon.

Acquisitions
1962 Wonhyeong Industrial CO
1968 Mipung Industrial CO
1971 Dongyang Jedang
1975 Yongin hog farm
1985 Dongryp Industrial Corp
1997 m.net, Cheil Investment & Securities
2000 39 Shopping
2004 CJ Consortium, Shin Dong Bang Corp., CJ Internet, Planers (now CJ Internet), Hanil Pharmaceuticals Ind., feed plant in Turkey
2006 Accord Express (Singaporean logistics company)
2017 CJ Darcl Logistics Limited
2007 Pioneer Trading, Inc.(now CJ Omnifood), an American food manufacturing company
2009 Onmedia
2011 Korea Express
2018 Schwans Company
2018 Kahiki Foods, an American food manufacturing company based in Columbus, Ohio

Subsidiaries 
source:

Food and food services
CJ CheilJedang Food division
CJ Foodville
Bibigo 
Cheiljemyunso (noodle restaurant)
China Factory (Chinese restaurant chain)
CJ Foodworld 
Seafood Ocean
The Steak House by VIPS (New York style steak restaurant)
Tous Les Jours (bakery franchise)
VIPS (steak and salad restaurant chain) 
VIPS Burger (burger chain)
CJ Freshway

Bio pharma
CJ CheilJedang's Bio division

Home shopping & logistics
CJ ENM O Shopping division
CJ Logistics
CJ Telenix
CJ Olive Networks Young division - launched in merger of CJ Olive Young and CJ Systems

Entertainment and media
CJ ENM E&M division
CJ CGV - multiplex cinema chain
Ciné de Chef
CJ Powercast
CJ LiveCity

Other language channels
Shop CJ India - Hindi Indian home shopping channel
O Shopping - Philippine home shopping channel
CJ Grand Shopping - Mexican home shopping channel
CJ Wow Shop - Malaysian home shopping channel (formerly)

Infrastructure
CJ Logistics E&C division
CJ Olive Networks IT business division

Former subsidiaries
CJ CheilJedang's Beverage Division - sold to Lotte Group in 2001
CJ Investment & Securities - sold to Hyundai Heavy Industries Group in 2008, then sold again to DGB Financial Group in 2018, now known as Hi Investment & Securities
CJ Asset Management - sold to Hyundai Heavy Industries Group in 2008, then sold again to VI AMC in 2020, now known as VI Asset Management
ChampVision also known as Champ TV - sold to Taekwang Group in 2011
KM - sold to GTV (Berry Entertainment & Media) in 2015, now known as GMTV
Badook TV - sold to Korea Baduk Association in 2015
CJ Digital Music - merged with Genie Music in 2018
A Twosome Place (premium dessert cafe)

See also
CJ Cup

References

External links
 

 
Chaebol
Conglomerate companies of South Korea
Conglomerate companies established in 1953
South Korean companies established in 1953
Companies based in Seoul
South Korean brands
Companies listed on the Korea Exchange
Lee family (South Korea)